The list below consists of the reasons delivered from the bench by the Supreme Court of Canada during 1993. This list, however, does not include decisions on motions.

Reasons

References
 1993 decisions: CanLII 

Reasons Of The Supreme Court Of Canada, 1993
Supreme Court of Canada reasons by year